Edward William Samcoff (September 1, 1924 – March 29, 2018) was an American professional baseball player. An infielder, his six-season (1946–1951) career in the game included a four-game stint in the Major Leagues for the Philadelphia Athletics at the outset of the  season. He was born in Sacramento, California.

Samcoff made his MLB debut on April 21, 1951 as a pinch hitter at Fenway Park against Chuck Stobbs of the Boston Red Sox; he batted for Philadelphia pitcher Bob Hooper and grounded out, Stobbs to first baseman Billy Goodman. He then started three consecutive games for the Athletics at second base from April 24–26. Samcoff went hitless in ten at bats with one base on balls, but played errorless ball in the field, handling ten chances and turning three double plays. He spent the remainder of the 1951 campaign in the minor leagues, with the Double-A Memphis Chicks of the Southern Association. In 795 minor league games played, Samcoff collected 851 hits and posted a batting average of .291. Samcoff died in March 2018 at the age of 93.

References

External links

1924 births
2018 deaths
Baseball players from Sacramento, California
Bremerton Bluejackets players
Charleston Rebels players
Major League Baseball second basemen
Memphis Chickasaws players
Oakland Oaks (baseball) players
Philadelphia Athletics players
Sioux City Soos players
Stockton Ports players